September 7 - Eastern Orthodox liturgical calendar - September 9

All fixed commemorations below celebrated on September 21 by Orthodox Churches on the Old Calendar.

For September 8th, Orthodox Churches on the Old Calendar commemorate the Saints listed on August 26.

Feasts
 The Nativity of Our Most Holy Lady the Theotokos and Ever-Virgin Mary.

Saints

 Martyrs Rufus and Rufianus, by the sword.
 Martyr Severus, by the sword.
 Martyr Artemidorus, by the sword.
 Martyrs Eusebius, Nestablus, Zeno, and Nestor, by a mob (c. 362)

Pre-Schism Western saints
 Saint Anastasius II, Pope of Rome (498)  (see also: November 19)
 Saint Kingsmark (Kinemark, Cynfarch), disciple of St. Dyfrig (5th century)
 Saint Æthelburh of Kent (Ethelburga), daughter of King Ethelbert of Kent, who married King Edwin of Northumbria, and founded the convent of Lyminge in Kent as abbess (c. 647)
 Saint Disibod (Disibode, Disen), founder of Disibodenberg Abbey in Rhineland-Palatinate, Germany (c. 700)
 Saint Sergius, Pope of Rome (701)
 Saint Corbinian, a hermit who was consecrated a Bishop and was sent as a missionary to Bavaria (c. 730)
 Saint Ine of Wessex, King of Wessex, and his wife Queen Ethelburga (c. 740)

Post-Schism Orthodox saints
 Saint Serapion, monk of Spaso-Eleazar Monastery, Pskov (1481)  (see also: September 7)
 Saint Lucian, Abbot, of Alexandrov (1654)
 New Martyr Athanasius of Thessaloniki (1774)
 Saint Sophronius, Bishop of Achtaleia in Iberia (Georgia) (1803)
 Saints Ioane (Maisuradze), Archimandrite (1957), and Giorgi-Ioane (Mkheidze), Schema-Archimandrite (1960), Confessors, of Georgia.

New martyrs and confessors
 New Martyr Alexander Jacobson, at Solovki (1930)
 New Martyr Demetrius, Priest (1937)

Other commemorations
 Translation of the relics of St. Grimbald, Abbot of Winchester Abbey.
 Repose of Archbishop Dionysius of Ufa (1896)
 Repose of Elder Daniel of Katounakia, Mount Athos (1929)
 Repose of Priest Dimitrie Bejan of Romania (1995)

Icons
 Icons of the Most Holy Theotokos:

 Kholmsk (1st century)
 "Kursk Root" (1295)
 Syamsk (1524)
 Pochaev (1559)
 Glinsk (16th century)
 Lukianov (16th century) 
 Isaakov (1659) 
 Domnitsk (1696)
 Lesna (Lesninsk) (1696)
 "Kathariotissa", on Ithaca (c. 1696)
 Icon of Sophia, the Wisdom of God (Kiev).
 Synaxis of the Most Holy Theotokos, at several locations in Greece.

Icon gallery

Notes

References

Sources
 September 8/September 21. Orthodox Calendar (PRAVOSLAVIE.RU).
 September 21 / September 8. HOLY TRINITY RUSSIAN ORTHODOX CHURCH (A parish of the Patriarchate of Moscow).
 September 8. OCA - The Lives of the Saints.
 The Autonomous Orthodox Metropolia of Western Europe and the Americas (ROCOR). St. Hilarion Calendar of Saints for the year of our Lord 2004. St. Hilarion Press (Austin, TX). p. 67.
 The Eighth Day of the Month of September. Orthodoxy in China.
 September 8. Latin Saints of the Orthodox Patriarchate of Rome.
 The Roman Martyrology. Transl. by the Archbishop of Baltimore. Last Edition, According to the Copy Printed at Rome in 1914. Revised Edition, with the Imprimatur of His Eminence Cardinal Gibbons. Baltimore: John Murphy Company, 1916. pp. 275–276.
 Rev. Richard Stanton. A Menology of England and Wales, or, Brief Memorials of the Ancient British and English Saints Arranged According to the Calendar, Together with the Martyrs of the 16th and 17th Centuries. London: Burns & Oates, 1892. pp. 440–441.

 Greek Sources
 Great Synaxaristes:  8 ΣΕΠΤΕΜΒΡΙΟΥ. ΜΕΓΑΣ ΣΥΝΑΞΑΡΙΣΤΗΣ.
  Συναξαριστής. 8 Σεπτεμβρίου. ECCLESIA.GR. (H ΕΚΚΛΗΣΙΑ ΤΗΣ ΕΛΛΑΔΟΣ).
  08/09/. Ορθόδοξος Συναξαριστής.

 Russian Sources
  21 сентября (8 сентября). Православная Энциклопедия под редакцией Патриарха Московского и всея Руси Кирилла (электронная версия). (Orthodox Encyclopedia - Pravenc.ru).
  8 сентября по старому стилю  /  21 сентября по новому стилю. Русская Православная Церковь - Православный церковный календарь на  год.

September in the Eastern Orthodox calendar